Henrik Adam Brockenhuus (30 May 1720 - 11 June 1803) was a Danish courtier, local administrator in Zealand. He owned the estates of Jungshoved, Oremandsgaard and Nysø and serv as prefect (amtmand(amtmand/stiftsamtmand) of Vordingborg Municipality from 1767 to 1776 and of the Diocese of Zealand from 1776 to 1787.

Biography
Brockenhuus was born in Vang at Hamar in Norway, the son of colonel Jørgen Otto Brockenhuus (1664–1728) and his second wife Bertha (Barte) Magdalene Brockenhuus (1684–1769). As a young man he became a close friend of crown prince Frederick (V).

He was appointed to hofjunker in 1744, then stable master for the crown prince and squire in 1745 and finally chamberlain ('kammerherre) in 1752.

In 1761, he purchased the estate of Jungshoved and Oremandsgaard near Præstø from the king. A few years later he also purchased Nysø Manor. In 1767, he was appointed to prefect (amtmand) of Vordingborg County and in 1776 he became prefect (Stiftsamtmand) of the Diocese of Zealand as well as curator of Vemmetofte. He was appointed to entlediget in 1787.

Titles
Gehejmeråd 1768. Gehejmekonferensråd 1779. He was awarded the Order of the Elephant in 1783.

Personal life
He married Elisabeth Holstein (19 October 1737 – 18 February 1786) on 11 June 1757. She was a daughter of  gehejmeråd'' Johan Ludvig Holstein (1694–1763) and Hedevig Vind (1707–56).

References

External links
 Family tree

18th-century Danish landowners
Court of Frederick V of Denmark
Danish courtiers
Brockenhuus family
1720 births
1803 deaths